is a 2011 Japanese film, a drama directed by Mayumi Komatsu.

Cast
 Yū Aoi
 Kaiji Moriyama
 Niamh Shaw

References

External links
 

2011 drama films
2011 directorial debut films
2011 films
Films directed by Mayumi Komatsu
Japanese drama films
2010s Japanese films